Beach Chair is the debut studio album by Indian-American violinist and producer Raaginder formerly known as Violinder. It was released October 29, 2014 independently. The album features guest appearances from vocalist Tina Mann, Fateh, Raxstar, Marcus Orelias, KinG!, Sodhivine and Surjit Singh Bawa. The production was mainly handled by Raaginder with the addition of JumpinGenres, Deep Dolla$, Sodhivine and Sango.

Background

Following the 2011 mixtape release Take One..., Raaginder then still using the moniker "Violinder" began to work on new music that wasn't "cover music" but originally composed and produced. Raaginder stated " It was the first time, I displayed my music productions and original compositions on a body of work.". The album's title was inspired by the Jay Z song "Beach Chair". The lead single "Dholna Ve" featuring Tina Mann was released on October 31, 2013. and was succeeded with "Raindrops" a tribute to Raaginder's mother whom passed away in April during the recording process and the single featured on The Times of India, "Bonfire/Coastin" featuring Sodhivine and KinG! a few months later on October 29, 2014. Due to a last minute addition the album was supposed to release on October 27, 2014 but was pushed back to October 29, 2014. On October 28th, a day before the albums release via Twitter, Momi teased the tracklist.

Track listing

Personnel

Notes
 JumpinGenres (track 1) - production
 Sodhivine (track 2) - production
 Deep Dolla$ (track 3) - production
 Raaginder (tracks 3-8, 10, 11) - production
 Sodhivine (track 9) - production
 Surjit Singh Bawa (track 6) - drums
 Tina Mann (track 3) - vocals
 Raxstar (track 5) - vocals
 Marcus Orelias (track 7) - vocals; sample arrangement
 KinG! (track 8) - vocals
 Fateh (track 11) - vocals
 Jeff Jackson (track 7) - Mixing engineer

Sample credits
 "Depth" contains a sample of "Beach Chair" written and performed by Raaginder featuring Marcus Orelias.
 "Beach Chair" contains inserts from the series Mad Men performed by Jon Hamm as Don Draper and January Jones as Betty Draper.

References

2014 albums